The Battle of Panamarathukotta (or Pancoorta Cottah) was fought between the British East India Company and the Nairs in Wayanad, in the south Indian state of Kottayam.

Further reading
 Malabar Manual by William Logan (1887; reprinted 2004). . Pages 539–542.

External links
 Google Books - Attack on Pancoorta Cottah

Colonial Kerala
Panamarathukotta